The Paris bid for the 2024 Summer Olympics and Summer Paralympics is the successful bid to bring the Games of the XXXIII Olympiad and the XVII Paralympic Games, to the French capital city. Paris formally announced its intention to bid on 23 June 2015 – the date on which Olympic Day is globally celebrated. Following withdrawals in the 2024 Summer Olympics bidding process that led to just two candidate cities (Los Angeles and Paris), the IOC announced that the 2028 Summer Olympics would be awarded at the same time as the 2024 Games. After Los Angeles agreed on 31 July 2017 to host the 2028 Games. It was officially announced at the IOC Session in Lima, Peru.

Paris previously hosted the 1900 Summer Olympics and the 1924 Summer Olympics. Paris will be the second city (after London) to host the Olympic games three times. Of note, 2024 marks the 100th anniversary of Paris' 1924 Summer Olympics, as well as the first Olympic Winter Games in Chamonix. On July 31, 2017, it was announced that rival bidder Los Angeles would host in 2028, effectively giving Paris the 2024 games.

Dates
The Olympic Games will be held from 2 August 2024 to 18 August 2024; while the Paralympic Games will be from 4 September 2024 to 15 September 2024. Paris will be the second city to host the games three times after London (1908, 1948 and 2012). These would be the sixth hosted games in France, and the third in summer. Los Angeles, which was announced as the 2028 Games host, will be the third city to host three times (1932 and 1984).

Venues, capacity
Venues are situated mainly in Paris. They also include Saint-Denis, Le Bourget, the Stade Olympique Yves-du-Manoir in Colombes, a centrepiece of the 1924 games, Vaires-sur-Marne, Versailles and a  venue for sailing in Marseille. Environmental concerns are taken into account, as there will be nine temporary venues and only three new ones in a total of forty - 95% of venues are existing or temporary.

Grand Paris Zone
 Stade de France — Opening and closing ceremonies, athletics (track and field events only), 75,000
 Seine-Saint-Denis — Aquatics Centre (diving, swimming, synchronised swimming), 17,000
 Water Polo Arena (Piscine de Marville) — Water polo, 6,250
 Le Bourget - Pavilion I - Badminton (temporary), 7,850
 Le Bourget - Pavilion II - Volleyball (temporary), 18,570 (13,010 in main court and 5,560 in secondary court)
 Le Bourget Shooting range - Shooting (temporary), 4,120
 Stade Olympique Yves-du-Manoir, Colombes - Hockey, 18,520
 U Arena, Nanterre — Gymnastics (artistic, trampoline and rhythmic), 17,500
 Palais des sports Marcel-Cerdan, Levallois-Perret - Basketball (women's preliminaries), 5,000

Paris Centre Zone
 Champ de Mars — Beach volleyball (temporary), 12,860
 Eiffel Tower and river Seine — Open water swimming, triathlon, surfing (temporary) 3,390 (10,000)
 Champs-Élysées — Cycling (road), skateboarding (street), athletics (marathons and race walks) (temporary) 4,470 (25,000), 
 Grand Palais — Fencing, taekwondo, 8,000
 Les Invalides — Archery (temporary), 8,000
 Jardins des Tuileries - Skateboarding (park) (temporary), 10,000
 Paris expo Porte de Versailles - Sport climbing (temporary), 6,650
 Halle Georges Carpentier - Table tennis, 5,009
 Stade Charlety - Baseball/softball (if accepted), 20,000
 Stade Jean-Bouin - Rugby, 20,000
 Stade Roland Garros — Tennis, 24,750
 Court Philippe Chatrier - Handball (play-offs), 15,000
 Court Suzanne Lenglen - Boxing, 10,000
 Court des Serres - Karate, 5,000
 other courts - Tennis, 2 000 + 8x250
 Parc des Princes - Football (preliminaries, semifinal, finals), 61,691
 Stade Pierre de Coubertin - Handball (preliminaries), 5,000
 Le Zénith - Weightlifting, 5,238
 Bercy Arena - Judo, basketball (men's last preliminary round, play-offs), 16,208
 Bercy Arena II - Basketball (preliminaries, not all), wrestling, 8,000

Versailles Zone
 Le Golf National — Golf, 32,720
 Vélodrome de Saint-Quentin-en-Yvelines — Cycling (track, BMX), modern pentathlon (fencing), two stands seating 5,000 and BMX 7,040
 Château de Versailles — Equestrian, modern pentathlon, 22,500 (dressage, jumping, modern pentathlon in temporary stadium), 40,000 (temporary circuit in the garden)
 Élancourt Hill — Mountain bike, 22,740

Stand-alone venues
 Vaires-sur-Marne — Rowing, canoeing (kayak and slalom), 24,000 (flatwater), 12,000 (slalom)
 Marseille — Sailing, 15,640

Non-competitive venues
 Le Bourget - Main press centre, international broadcast centre, media village
 L'Île-Saint-Denis (will be built) - Olympic Village
 Marseille Chanot Exhibition Park - Satellite Olympic Village for football (also teams playing elsewhere than Lille, Nantes or Paris) and sailing athletes

Football venues (9 candidates qualified even to 6 eventually)
 Stade Vélodrome, Marseille, 67,000
 Parc des Princes, Paris, 61,000 (final venue, no cutout from final list)
 Parc Olympique Lyonnais, Lyon, 59,000
 Stade Pierre-Mauroy, Lille, 50,000
 Nouveau Stade de Bordeaux, Bordeaux, 42,000
 Stade Geoffroy Guichard, Saint-Étienne, 42,000
 Stade de la Beaujoire, Nantes (renovated), 38,000
 Allianz Riviera, Nice, 35,000
 Stadium Municipal, Toulouse, 32,000

Logo
The bid logo was unveiled on 9 February 2016 at the Arc de Triomphe, The logo symbolises the dynamic ribbons colors of the Olympic rings shaping the iconic Eiffel Tower with the "2" and "4" represents the number "24" and the year "2024". The bid logo was designed by French agency Dragon Rouge.

Slogan
The slogan was launched on 3 February 2017, at the Eiffel Tower: Made For Sharing (French: "Venez Partager").

Promotion
The bid was heavily promoted during the 2017 Tour de France.  Members of the bid team assisted in presenting the yellow jersey to the race leader after each day's stage, and during the final day in Paris the riders rode through the Grand Palais (site of the fencing and taekwondo events) en route to the final laps on the Champs-Élysées (site of the road cycling events).  Additionally, during stage 12 from Pau to Peyragudes, a special marker was placed at kilometer 2024 overall in the race to promote the bid.

See also
Paris bid for the 2012 Summer Olympics

References

External links
 Paris 2024

Candidature file
 Stage 1: Vision, Games Concept and Strategy
 Stage 2: Governance, Legal and Venue Funding
 Stage 3: Games Delivery, Experience and Venue Legacy

2024 Summer Olympics bids
Summer Olympics in Paris
2024